The Marcus Sears Bell Farm, also known as the Bell-Tierney Farmstead, is located in New Richmond, Wisconsin, United States. It was added to the National Register of Historic Places in 1988.

It includes a two-story Italianate farmhouse with a hipped roof and with endboard pilasters.

New Richmond Heritage Center
The Bell-Tierney Farmstead is now the central site of the New Richmond Heritage Center.  Other historic buildings on the property include a log barn with blacksmith and carpenter tool collections, a one-room schoolhouse, a mid-20th century rural general store, and a late 19th-century Lutheran church.

References

External links
 New Richmond Heritage Center

Farms on the National Register of Historic Places in Wisconsin
Buildings and structures in St. Croix County, Wisconsin
Italianate architecture in Wisconsin
Buildings and structures completed in 1884
Houses in St. Croix County, Wisconsin
Museums in St. Croix County, Wisconsin
Open-air museums in Wisconsin
National Register of Historic Places in St. Croix County, Wisconsin